Hugh II, Count of Rethel (died 1227) was a son of Manasses IV and his wife, Matilda of Kyrburg.  In 1199, he succeeded his father as Count of Rethel.

In 1191, he married Felicitas (d. 1257), the daughter of Simon of Broyes.  They had the following children:
 Helissende (d. 1234), married Thomas, the son of Geoffroy III, Count of Perche
 Hugh III (d. 1243)
 Matilda, married Thomas II of Coucy-Vervins (1184–1253), the son of Ralph I, Lord of Coucy
 John (d. 1251), married Marie of Thourotte
 Walter (d. 1262)
 Manasses V (d. 1273)

References

Counts of Rethel
12th-century births
1227 deaths
Year of birth unknown
12th-century French people
13th-century French people